Josef "Sepp" Schneeberger (November 11, 1919 – February 10, 1989) was an Austrian cross-country skier who competed in the 1950s. He finished 23rd in the 18 km event at the 1952 Winter Olympics in Oslo. Four years later he was a member of the Austrian relay team which finished eleventh in the 4 x 10 km relay event.

References

External links
18 km Olympic cross country results: 1948-52
Mention of Josef Schneeberger's death 

1919 births
1989 deaths
Austrian male cross-country skiers
Cross-country skiers at the 1952 Winter Olympics
Cross-country skiers at the 1956 Winter Olympics
Olympic cross-country skiers of Austria
20th-century Austrian people